The 2011–12 Montana Grizzlies basketball team represented the University of Montana during the 2011–12 NCAA Division I men's basketball season. The Grizzlies, led by sixth year head coach Wayne Tinkle, played their home games at Dahlberg Arena and are members of the Big Sky Conference. They finished the season 25–7, 15–1 in Big Sky play to be crowned regular season champions. They were also champions the Big Sky Basketball tournament to earn the conference's automatic berth into the NCAA tournament where they lost in the second round to Wisconsin.

Roster

Schedule

|-
!colspan=9| Exhibition

|-
!colspan=9| Regular season

|-
!colspan=9| 2012 Big Sky Conference men's basketball tournament

|-
!colspan=9| 2012 NCAA tournament

References

Montana Grizzlies basketball seasons
Montana
Montana
Montana Grizzlies basketball
Montana Grizzlies basketball